Vavřinec is a municipality and village in Blansko District in the South Moravian Region of the Czech Republic. It has about 900 inhabitants.

Administrative parts
Villages and hamlets of Nové Dvory, Punkevní Žleb, Suchdol and Veselice are administrative parts of Vavřinec.

References

Villages in Blansko District